Religious discrimination in the United States is valuing or treating a person or group differently because of what they do or do not believe. Specifically, it occurs when adherents of different religions (or denominations) are treated unequally, either before the law or in institutional settings such as employment or housing.

Steve Pfaff, a University of Washington professor of sociology said that “Religious bias may be a very serious problem, but it has been studied less than other types of discrimination, such as race- or gender-based discrimination.”

Background

Religious discrimination in the history of the United States dates back to the first Protestant Christian European settlers, composed mostly of English Puritans, during the British colonization of North America (16th century), directed both towards Native Americans and non-Protestant Catholic European settlers. In the United States, the Free Exercise Clause of the First Amendment states that "Congress shall make no law respecting an establishment of religion, or prohibiting the free exercise thereof".

In a 1979 consultation on the issues, the United States Commission on Civil Rights defined religious discrimination in relation to the civil rights guaranteed by the Fifth Amendment to the United States Constitution. Whereas religious civil liberties, such as the right to hold or not to hold a religious belief, are essential for Freedom of Religion (in the United States secured by the First Amendment), religious discrimination occurs when someone is denied "the equal protection of the laws, equality of status under the law, equal treatment in the administration of justice, and equality of opportunity and access to employment, education, housing, public services and facilities, and public accommodation because of their exercise of their right to religious freedom."

However, in 1878, the U.S. Supreme Court has ruled that religious duty is not a suitable defense to a criminal indictment, and that religious activities could be regulated by law.

Notable examples

Discrimination against Catholics

Antisemitism

Discrimination against Muslims

Based on the research carried out by the University of Washington, Muslims and atheists in the United States deal with experience religious discrimination more than those of Christian faiths.

According to a Pew Research Center survey carried out in March 2019, "Most American adults (82%) say Muslims are subject to at least some discrimination in the U.S. today". The  2017 survey of Muslim Americans illustrated that "Among U.S. Muslims themselves, many say they have experienced specific instances of discrimination, including being treated with suspicion, singled out by airport security or called offensive names." 63 percent of American adults believed in that being Muslim hurts someone’s chances for advancement in American society at least".

Discrimination against atheists

Discrimination against Neopagans

Discrimination against Jehovah's Witnesses

Reynolds v. United States

In 1878  the U.S. supreme court, in Reynolds v. United States, ruled that a law against bigamy was not considered to be religiously discriminatory against members of the Church of Jesus Christ of Latter-day Saints (LDS Church), who were practicing polygamy up until 1890.  George Reynolds was a member of the LDS Church, and was convicted of  bigamy under the Morrill Anti-Bigamy Act.  He was secretary to Brigham Young and presented himself as a test of the federal government's attempt to outlaw polygamy.

The Court investigated the history of religious freedom in the United States and quoted a letter from Thomas Jefferson in which he wrote that there was a distinction between religious belief and action that flowed from religious belief. The former "lies solely between man and his God," therefore "the legislative powers of the government reach actions only, and not opinions." The court considered that if polygamy was allowed, someone might eventually argue that human sacrifice was a necessary part of their religion, and "to permit this would be to make the professed doctrines of religious belief superior to the law of the land, and in effect to permit every citizen to become a law unto himself." The Court believed the First Amendment forbade Congress from legislating against opinion, but allowed it to legislate against action.  Therefore, religious duty was not a suitable defense to a criminal indictment, religious activates could be regulated by law.

Religious tests

The No Religious Test Clause of the United States Constitution is found in Article VI, paragraph 3. This has been interpreted to mean that no federal employee, whether elected or appointed, career or political, can be required to adhere to or accept any religion or belief.

However, some state and local jurisdictions have enacted legal restrictions that require a religious test as a qualification for holding public office.  For instance in Texas an official may be "excluded from holding office" if he or she does not "acknowledge the existence of a Supreme Being." (i.e. God), thus atheists, agnostics, most Satanists, some Unitarian Universalists and New Age followers, who do not believe in a supreme being would be excluded from public office.

Native American religious practices

Peyote usage

Peyote is listed by the United States DEA as a Schedule I controlled substance.  However, practitioners of the Peyote Way Church of God, a Native American religion, perceive the regulations regarding the use of Peyote as discriminating, leading to religious discrimination issues regarding about the U.S. policy towards drugs. As the result of Peyote Way Church of God, Inc. v. Thornburgh the American Indian Religious Freedom Act of 1978 was passed.  This federal statute allow the "Traditional Indian religious use of the peyote sacrament," exempting only use by Native American persons.  Other jurisdictions have similar statutory exemptions in reaction to the U.S. Supreme Court's decision in Employment Division v. Smith, which held that laws prohibiting the use of peyote that do not specifically exempt religious use nevertheless do not violate the Free Exercise Clause of the First Amendment.

Eagle Feather usage
The Eagle Feather Law, which governs the possession and religious use of eagle feathers, was officially written to protect then dwindling eagle populations while still protecting traditional Native American spiritual and religious customs, of which the use of eagles are central. The Eagle Feather Law later met charges of promoting racial and religious discrimination due to the law’s provision authorizing the possession of eagle feathers to members of only one ethnic group, Native Americans, and forbidding Native Americans from including non-Native Americans in indigenous customs involving eagle feathers—a common modern practice dating back to the early 16th century.

Boston University and University of South Dakota
Charges of religious and racial discrimination have also been found in the education system. In a recent example, the dormitory policies at Boston University and The University of South Dakota were charged with racial and religious discrimination when they forbade a university dormitory resident from smudging while praying. The policy at The University of South Dakota was later changed to permit students to pray while living in the university dorms. Another example concerns the Peralta Community College District which threatened to discipline two students when they prayed for a sick professor. The college later rescinded the warnings when threatened with a lawsuit.

Church of Jesus Christ Christian
In 2004, a case involving five Ohio prison inmates (two followers of Asatru, a minister of the Church of Jesus Christ Christian, a Wiccan witch and a Satanist) protesting denial of access to ceremonial items and opportunities for group worship was brought before the Supreme Court. The Boston Globe reports on the 2005 decision of Cutter v. Wilkinson in favour of the claimants as a notable case. Among the denied objects was instructions for runic writing requested by an Asatruer. Inmates of the "Intensive Management Unit"  at Washington State Penitentiary who are adherents of Asatru in 2001 were deprived of their Thor's Hammer medallions. In 2007, a federal judge confirmed that Asatru adherents in US prisons have the right to possess a Thor’s Hammer pendant. An inmate sued the Virginia Department of Corrections after he was denied it while members of other religions were allowed their medallions.

Merrill Lynch
Religious discrimination has also been documented in employment in the United States, such as an Equal Employment Opportunity Commission (EEOC) lawsuit alleging discrimination against an Iranian-Muslim employee by the Merrill Lynch company in the United States.

Cooke et al v. Colorado City, Town of et al
On March 20, 2014, a jury hearing the case of Cooke et al v. Colorado City, Town of et al ruled that the twin towns of Colorado City and Hildale had discriminated against Ronald and Jinjer Cooke because they were not members of the Fundamentalist Church of Jesus Christ of Latter-Day Saints (FLDS church).  The Cookes were awarded $5.2 million for "religious discrimination".  The Cooke family moved to the Short Creek Community in 2008 but were refused access to utilities by the town governments.  As a result of the ruling, Arizona's Attorney General Tom Horne issued a press release stating that he "wants to eradicate discrimination in two polygamous towns" and believes that the court ruling will give him the tools to do it.

See also

Main pages
Religion in the United States
Freedom of religion in the United States
History of religion in the United States
Religious discrimination
Islamophobia in the United States
Antisemitism in the United States
Anti-Catholicism in the United States
Anti-atheist sentiment in the United States
General
Secularization
Discrimination
Civil rights
Intersectionality
Islamic religious police
OUT Campaign
List of anti-discrimination acts
Religious intolerance
Religious persecution
Religious segregation
Religious violence
Sectarian violence 

Specific
 Anti-Catholicism
 Anti-Christian sentiment
 Anti-Protestantism
 Anti-clericalism
 Anti-Judaism
 Anti-Semitism
 Anti-Islamism, not to be confused with Islamophobia 
 Discrimination against atheists
 Religious discrimination against Neopagans
 Anti-cult movement, people and groups who oppose cults and new religious movements
 Anti-Mormonism
 Anti-Hinduism

Notes

 
Discrimination
History of religion in the United States